Unified Team may refer to:

A team representing countries of the former Soviet Union in the Olympic Games and Paralympics in 1992:
 Unified Team at the Olympics
 Unified Team at the Paralympics

The team also competed at the 1992 World Junior Championships in Athletics.

See also
 CIS national football team
 United Team of Germany, representing West Germany, East Germany and Saarland in the Olympic Games in 1956, and East and West Germany in the Olympic Games of 1960 and 1964
 Korea Team, unified team of North and South Korea